Asterix and Caesar's Gift is the twenty-first volume of the Asterix comic book series, by René Goscinny (stories) and Albert Uderzo (illustrations). It was the first Asterix adventure that was not published in serial form in Pilote magazine prior to its publication as a book.

Synopsis
Having completed twenty years of service in the Roman Army, veteran legionaries Tremensdelirius and Egganlettus await their honesta missio (Latin: honorary discharge) in the morning, but that night a drunk Tremensdelirius insults Julius Caesar and gets arrested. When Caesar is informed of Tremensdelirius's mishap, he decides to play a practical joke on him. Caesar awards a "special gift" to Tremensdelirius: Asterix's village in Armorica, the only territory of Gaul not yet conquered by the Roman legions. Tremensdelirius sees little merit in a gift he cannot drink and winds up exchanging the gift for wine and food at an inn in Arausio, owned by Orthopaedix.

Orthopaedix, his wife Angina and daughter Influenza arrive at the village only to be disappointed to find it already inhabited, and that Caesar does not own the village at all (making the gift worthless). With no place to go, Angina berates her husband for selling their inn to travel to Armorica. Vitalstatistix overhears the conversation and decides to offer Orthopaedix a building to open a new inn. Obelix soon has a crush on Influenza, while Geriatrix doesn't welcome Orthopaedix and his family, regarding them as outsiders. The villagers attend the new inn's opening night, but Vitalstatistix's wife Impedimenta and Angina start arguing about who owns the village. A fight ensues and the inn is trashed as a result.

The next morning, a bruised Orthopaedix is ready to leave and return to Lutetia, his hometown, but Angina wants to have revenge on Impedimenta and makes a claim to the leadership of the village on behalf of her husband. Vitalstatistix, shocked, has Cacofonix obtain an opinion poll of the villagers and learns that aside from Geriatrix, the villagers don't really care, until Vitalstatistix makes a few remarks that offends some of the villagers, making them go to the other side. A political race starts, and Geriatrix thinks Vitalstatistix is weak and tries to stand for Chief himself. Asterix becomes worried that internal conflict could benefit the Romans. Meanwhile, Tremensdelirius arrives at the village to visit Orthopaedix, explains that since their last meeting he unsuccessfully tried all kinds of trade and he wants his land back, since he is in fact not allowed to sell the land. When the family refuses, he draws his sword. Asterix arrives, and the two fight, with Asterix winning. Influenza is impressed, while Tremensdelirius, swearing revenge, goes to the Laudanum Roman camp and finds his old friend Egganlettus serving as an aide-de-camp under the local centurion (as he found retirement boring and signed up for another 20 years). With his support, Tremensdelirius makes an official request to the centurion to restore his land. The centurion is reluctant to face the Gauls, but the veterans threaten to report him to Caesar, and he agrees to prepare a military attack with the new weapons they have.

The following day, Influenza expresses her admiration to Asterix, making the jealous Obelix feel betrayed. Asterix attempts to warn everyone about Tremensdelirius, but his warning falls on deaf ears. Hence, Asterix decides to investigate and discovers that the Romans are preparing siege weapons. The Romans see him, but are afraid to attack, allowing him to retreat and escape (as he has no magic potion with him to fight against them). His escape gives the Romans the belief that the Gauls can no longer resist the Romans, and makes them more confident.

Asterix returns to the village and attempts to warn them, but everyone gathers to witness the public debate between Vitalstatistix and Orthopaedix, until it is interrupted by rocks launched from the Roman catapults. Vitalstatistix begs for Getafix to give them magic potion, but the druid refuses, too disgusted by the Gaulish in-fighting. When Vitalstatistix asks for the druid to give magic potion to his rival instead, Getafix finally agrees to help them. The villagers manages to defeat the Romans, with Orthopaedix himself confronting Tremensdelirius and smashing Caesar's gift on Tremensdelirius's head.

The Gauls are reconciled following their victory. A much more confident Orthopaedix befriends his former rival, and decides to withdraw his claim for leadership and return to Lutetia, despite Angina's objections. Impedimenta and Angina also become friends. Obelix is saddened that Influenza will be leaving with her parents but is reconciled with Asterix. The village then hosts a banquet.

Commentary
The granting of land to Roman soldiers after long years of service is historically true.
Tremensdelirius, in English, was named after his drunkenness; in the original French language his name is given as Roméomontaigus after Romeo Montague, one of two title characters in Romeo and Juliet by William Shakespeare. The connection between the two characters is not particularly evident.
Orthopaedix is drawn as a caricature of André Alerme (September 9, 1877 – February 2, 1960), an actor.
Influenza is called 'Zaza' for short (a possible reference to Zsa Zsa Gabor), and therefore interprets Asterix's victory over Tremensdelirius, in which he cut the letter 'Z' in Tremensdelirius' clothing, as dedicated to her. In fact the Z is a reference to Zorro; the TV series was often shown on TV in continental Europe.  Asterix's dialogue during the swordfight is a reference to Cyrano de Bergerac. (In the English translation it includes references to the climactic swordfight in Hamlet.)
Vitalstatistix and his brother-in-law Homeopathix confront each other in person at the beginning and the finale of Asterix and the Laurel Wreath, and Impedimenta entertains hopes of the two entering a partnership in Asterix and the Soothsayer; whereas here, Vitalstatistix befriends Orthopaedix on grounds that the latter, like himself, has quarreled with in-laws in Lutetia.
This is the second time Vitalstatistix is challenged by a contender to the leadership of the village, and the first time his leadership is challenged by the population of the village. He is not challenged again until Asterix and the Secret Weapon.
This is the first time the Gauls of the story are shown electing leaders as if in democracy; but here, the leader has no fixed term and retains leadership until challenged; potentially until death.
This story has one of only a few scenes where Asterix uses his sword, and one of an equally few in which Cacofonix is not bound and gagged at the end of the story.
The story parodies political campaigns in general, election campaigns in particular, and perhaps especially the French presidential election of 1974, date of publication of the album. Election day is mentioned as set for the celebration day of Lugh; but the election is cancelled after the withdrawal of Orthopaedix.
In some of the scenes (after Vitalstatistix falls off his shield), there is a hen in love with Vitalstatistix's helmet.

Reception 
On Goodreads, it has a score of 4.10 out of 5.

External links
Book annotations
English Website

References

Caesar's Gift, Asterix and
1974 graphic novels
Works by René Goscinny
Comics by Albert Uderzo
Depictions of Julius Caesar in comics